Liberty Hill is an unincorporated community in Fayette County, Tennessee, United States.

References

Unincorporated communities in Fayette County, Tennessee
Unincorporated communities in Tennessee